Aswad are a British reggae group, noted for adding strong R&B and soul influences to the reggae sound. They have been performing since the mid-1970s, having released a total of 21 albums. Their UK hit singles include the number one "Don't Turn Around" (1988) and "Shine" (1994). "Aswad" is Arabic for "black". They are three-time Grammy Award nominees.

History
The members of Aswad are UK descendants of immigrants from the Caribbean. They attended John Kelly/Holland Park School. Aswad was formed in 1975 in Ladbroke Grove area of West London.

The original members of Aswad were guitarist/vocalist Brinsley "Chaka B" Forde, drummer/vocalist Angus "Drummie Zeb" Gaye, lead guitarist/vocalist Donald "Dee" Griffiths, bassist George "Ras" Oban, and keyboardist Courtney "Khaki" Hemmings. Aswad were the backing band of Burning Spear's 1977 Live album, recorded at the Rainbow Theatre in London. Other contributors included Vin Gordon, and Karl Pitterson.

Initially, the band produced music in the roots reggae vein, with members contributing songs individually and with Forde acting as the band's principal songwriter. The band's dynamic soon began to change however. Shortly after the release of their self-titled debut album in 1976, Hemmings left and was replaced by Tony "Gad" Robinson (the only time in the band's history where a departing member would be officially replaced by an incoming musician). The band then released their second studio effort, Hulet, in 1978, before Oban departed the band in 1979, with Robinson taking over the position of bassist as well as continuing his role as keyboardist. The following year saw Griffiths depart, leaving Forde as the band's sole guitarist. During this early period in the band's history they were distinctly different from Jamaican reggae acts, in that they wrote songs that dealt with the issues surrounding the experiences of black youths growing-up in the UK; such as "Three Babylon" and "It's Not Our Wish", and the powerful jazz-influenced instrumental "Warrior Charge".

Once the band's line-up had stabilised into the trio of Forde, Gaye, and Robinson, Aswad followed a more commercial reggae style, gaining a wider audience with the New Chapter album (1981). They then followed this with the Michael Reuben Campbell-produced A New Chapter of Dub LP which was a dub of the entire New Chapter album. Not Satisfied was a London roots-reggae album released in 1982. "Love Fire" gained wide recognition when it was used as the backing rhythm for Dennis Brown's "Promised Land".

Among Aswad's catalogue of hits is "Don't Turn Around", a UK No. 1 hit in 1988, originally recorded by Tina Turner as a B-side to her "Typical Male" single. They followed this up with UK No. 11 hit "Give a Little Love", and a reggae-flavoured rendition of "Best of My Love", first popularised and written by The Eagles. In 1989, they contributed the single "Set Them Free" to the Greenpeace Rainbow Warriors album. In the same year, they performed together with Cliff Richard the song "Share a Dream", recorded the previous year, at Wembley Stadium as part of The Event (16 and 17 June 1989). Their next single, "Shine", was released in 1994 and was a big hit in much of Europe. Another track was the upbeat 1998 remake of The Police's "Invisible Sun", performed with Sting.

The band also hold the distinction of having played with each one of the ex-Wailers.

The band has toured extensively, playing in diverse locations from London's Royal Albert Hall and Montego Bay's Reggae Sunsplash, to gigs in West Africa, Israel and Japan.

Aswad underwent their first line-up change in sixteen years in 1996, when Forde departed the band for spiritual reasons, leaving Gaye as the only founding member. Once again, the remaining members opted not to seek to recruit a replacement musician, and thus Aswad became a duo of Gaye and Robinson. With the exception of a brief reunion with Forde in 2009 for the Island record label's 50th-anniversary celebrations, the band's line-up remained the same until Angus Gaye’s death in 2022. Gaye died on 2 September 2022, aged 62.

Aswad released their final studio album to date in 2009, with City Lock. They released the singles "What Is Love?" and "Do That Thing" in the same year.

Members
 Brinsley "Dan" Forde – vocals, lead & rhythm guitars (1975–1996, 2009)
 Angus "Drummie Zeb" Gaye – vocals, drums (1975–2022) (died 2022)
 Donald "Dee" Griffiths – lead guitars (1975–1980)
 Courtney "Khaki" Hemmings – keyboards (1975–1976)
 George "Ras" Oban – bass (1975–1979)
 Tony "Gad" Robinson – bass, keyboards, vocals (1976–2022)

Additional musicians

 Stanley Andrew – lead guitars, rhythm guitars, acoustic guitars, vocals
 Clifton "Bigga" Morrison – vocals, keyboards, melodica
 Martin "Tatta" Augustine – lead guitars
 John Kpiaye – guitars
 Jimmy "Senyah" Haynes – lead guitars, acoustic guitars
 Michael "Bammie" Rose – saxophone
 Vin "Trommie" Gordon – trombone
 Eddie "Tan Tan" Thornton – trumpet
 Carlton "Bubblers" Ogilvie – keyboards
 Jimmy "J-Slice" Neath – trumpet

 Paul Garred – guitars
 Michael Martin – keyboards
 Patrick Tenyue – trumpet
 Henry 'Buttons' Tenyue – trombone
 Brian Edwards – saxophone
 Trevor “T-BoNe” Jones – trombone
 Perry "Lion" Melius – drums
 Kenrick Rowe – drums
 Paul Slowley – drums

Discography

Albums

Singles

Production work
 Ace of Base remix of "Don't Turn Around" (No.5 hit in the UK)
 Vanessa Mae – "Classical Gas" (#41 in UK) 
 Janet Kay – "Missing You"

See also
List of reggae musicians
John Arnison

References

External links

Biography and discography
"Aswad: Reggae Gold", interview by Pete Lewis, Blues & Soul, July 2009.
Gallery of Aswad party pictures by dz studios
Myspace profile
 
 

Musical groups from London
British reggae musical groups
Black British musical groups
Reggae fusion groups
Island Records artists
Gut Records artists
Musical groups established in 1975
Musical groups disestablished in 2022
1975 establishments in England
2022 disestablishments in England